Oleksandr Viktorovych Svystunov (born 30 August 1973) is a former Ukrainian professional footballer.

Club career
He made his professional debut in the Soviet First League in 1990 for SC Tavriya Simferopol. He played 2 games in the 2001–02 UEFA Cup for FC Chernomorets Novorossiysk.

References

1973 births
People from Yalta
Living people
Soviet footballers
Ukrainian footballers
Ukrainian expatriate footballers
Ukraine under-21 international footballers
Ukraine international footballers
Ukrainian Premier League players
Russian Premier League players
SC Tavriya Simferopol players
NK Veres Rivne players
FC Zenit Saint Petersburg players
FC Metalurh Donetsk players
FC Chernomorets Novorossiysk players
FC Rubin Kazan players
FC Vorskla Poltava players
FC Arsenal Kyiv players
FC Borysfen Boryspil players
FC Volgar Astrakhan players
Expatriate footballers in Russia
FC Arsenal Tula players
Association football midfielders
Ukrainian expatriate sportspeople in Russia